Herman Charles Groman (August 18, 1882 – July 23, 1954) was an American athlete who competed mainly in the 400 metres for Yale University and the Chicago Athletic Club. He won a bronze medal in the 400 meters in the 1904 Olympics. He was a graduate of Yale University and Rush Medical College and later lived in Hammond, Indiana.

References

American male sprinters
Olympic bronze medalists for the United States in track and field
Athletes (track and field) at the 1904 Summer Olympics
1882 births
1954 deaths
Medalists at the 1904 Summer Olympics